Korporatsioon Vironia (abbreviated korp! Vironia or C!V!) is an Estonian fraternal student society and the oldest student corps in Estonia. The organization is named after the Latin name for the ancient Estonian county of Virumaa. A full member of the organization is called a "vironus" (abbr. "vir!"), while every member can also be called a "Vironian" (viroonlane).

History 
It remained the only Estonian student corps in Riga and became also the only Estonian member of the two Baltic German corps federations (Chargierten-Convent) in the Baltic governorates. Vironia was also the initiator and the co-founder of the League of Estonian Corporations in 1915.

After a brief evacuation to Moscow during World War I in 1915 and short return to Riga in 1918, Vironia entered the Estonian War of Independence in corpore. 6 of its members died in the war and one died of war injuries after the war. It was reactivated in Tartu, Estonia in 1920 and opened a second chapter in Tallinn in 1936. After being banned following the Soviet occupation of the Baltic states in 1940, it opened 8 colonies abroad in 6 Western countries and there was also unofficial activity in Venezuela. Underground activity in occupied Estonia was restored in the 1960s and the chapters in Tallinn and Tartu were legally restored in 1989. Today, Vironia has more than 550 members worldwide, being among the biggest Estonian student organizations. Active chapters in Estonia exist in Tallinn and Tartu and active colonies exist in Toronto and the US West Coast and inactive colonies in Sweden and Australia.

Foreign relations
Vironia retains good relations with all non-Baltic German members of the former Riga Chargierten-Convent:
 (1879, Polish, currently in Warsaw)
 (1880, Baltic Russian, separate colony in Tartu)
 (1880, Latvian)
 (1883, Polish, currently in Warsaw)
 (1900, Latvian)

Of these, Vironia also has cartel agreements with Welecja (signed 1936) and Fraternitas Arctica (signed 2010). Vironia has also signed cartel agreements with the Karjalainen Osakunta in Helsinki (1930) and is currently an active member of the League of Estonian Corporations, having also signed a cartel agreement with Fraternitas Estica (2009).

Notable members

Banking
Eduard Aule (1878-1947) - President of the Bank of Estonia (1921-1925), Deputy President of the Bank of Estonia (1919-1921)
Artur Uibopuu (1879-1930) - President of the Bank of Estonia (1925-1926)
Oskar Kerson (1887-1980) - President of the Bank of Estonia in Exile (1968-1980)
Märten Ross (b. 1971) - Deputy President of the Bank of Estonia (2000-2011)

Culture
Ernst Enno (1875–1934) - Poet and writer
Edgar Johan Kuusik (1888–1974) - Architect
Edgar Valter Saks (1910–1984) - Historian and author
Erik Orav (1953-2012) - Director Sid Deutsche Gallery NY and the legendary Leo Castelli Gallery NY
Harry Männil (1920–2010) - Businessman, cultural benefactor
Boris Kõrver (1917-1994) - Composer and musician
Roman Toi (1916-2018) - Composer, conductor and organist
Albert Tattar (1901-1989) - Founder of Venezuela's 5th largest conglomerate and cultural benefactor to Estonians

Military
Nikolai Link (1880-1943) - Captain lieutenant (equal to Lieutenant colonel)
Artur Perna (1881-1940) - Lieutenant colonel
Paul Borkmann (1891-1936) - Colonel
Gustav Jonson (1880-1942) - Major General, Chief of Cavalry regiments of the Estonian Ground Force in the War of Independence (1918-1919)
Aleksander Tilger (1897-1944) - Lieutenant colonel
Eduard Liibus (1893-1941) - Colonel
Jaan Unt (1894-1974) - Lieutenant colonel
Elias Kasak (1895-1985) - Colonel
Voldemar Karing (1895-1942) - Colonel

Politics
Karl Ipsberg (1870–1943) - Minister of Roads (1921-1923), deputy Minister of Commerce and Industry (1921-1922), MP (1919-1926 with intervals)
Jaan Raudsepp (1873-1945) - Minister of Roads (1932)
Eduard Aule (1878-1947) - Minister of Nutrition (1919), MP (1917-1919 with intervals)
Artur Uibopuu (1879-1930) - MP (1919-1920)
Oskar Amberg (1878–1963) - Minister of Labour and Welfare (1923-1924), Minister of War (1924), Minister of Roads (1925-1926), MP (1920-1925 with intervals)
Georg Vestel (1882-1933) - Deputy State Elder (1921-1922), Minister of Monetary Affairs (1921-1924), Minister of Commerce-Industry (1922-1923)
Villem Reinok (1882-1958) - MP (1922)
Jaan Mägi (1883-1939) - MP (1919-1921 with intervals)
Johan Sihver (1882-1942) - MP (1929-1940, with intervals)
Hugo Kaho (1885-1964) - MP (1938-1940)
Juhan Kalm (1884-1953) - MP (1917-1919)
Anton Teetsov (1889-1941) - Minister of Monetary Affairs (1927-1928)
Leo Sepp (1892-1941) - Minister of Monetary Affairs (1924-1927), Minister of Economic Affairs (1938-1940)
Edgar Sulg (1891-1970) - MP (1926-1929)
August Kerem (1889-1942) - Deputy State Elder (1927-1928), Minister of Agriculture (1920, 1923-1925, 1929-1931), Minister of Roads (1926-1928), Minister of Defense (1931-1932, 1933)
Peeter Kurvits (1881-1962) - Minister of Economic Affairs (1933), II Deputy President of the Riigikogu (1921-1923), MP (1920-1934, with intervals)
Tõnis Kint (1896–1991) - Prime Minister in duties of the President (1970-1990), acting Prime Minister in Exile (1963-1964), Deputy Prime Minister in Exile (1960-1962, 1964-1971), Minister of Agriculture in Exile (1953-1970), Acting Minister of War in Exile (1953-1970), MP (1937-1940)
Nikolai Viitak (1896-1942) - Minister of Roads (1937-1940), MP (1938)
Juhan Kurvits (1895-1953) - MP (1917-1919)
Karl Selter (1898–1958) - Minister of Economic Affairs (1933-1938), Minister of Foreign Affairs (1938-1939), MP (1937-1939, with intervals)
Viktor Päts (1906-1952) - MP (1937-1940, with intervals)
Edgar V. Saks (1910-1984) - Minister of Education in Exile (1971-1984)
Andres Küng (1945-2002) - MP (1990-1992), MP of Sweden (1982-1983)
Juhan Ross (1925-2002) - MP (1990-1992)
Kalev Kallemets (b. 1979) - MP (2012-2014, with intervals)

Science and Education
Karl Ipsberg (1870–1943) - Rector of the Special Engineering Courses (1918)
Hugo Kaho (1885-1964) - Rector of the University of Tartu (1938-1940)

External links

1900s establishments in Estonia
Student organizations established in 1900
1900 establishments in the Russian Empire